Joseph, Baron Van Damme (born 25 August 1940 in Brussels), known as José van Dam, is a Belgian bass-baritone.

At the age of 17, he entered the Brussels Royal Conservatory and studied with Frederic Anspach. A year later, he graduated with diplomas and first prizes in voice and opera performance. He made his opera début as the music teacher Don Basilio in Gioacchino Rossini’s Il Barbiere di Siviglia at the Paris Opera in 1961, and remained in the company until 1965, when he sang his first major role, Escamillo from Bizet's Carmen. He then sang for two seasons at Geneva, La Scala, Covent Garden, and in Paris. At Geneva, Van Dam sang in the première of Milhaud's La mère coupable in 1966. Lorin Maazel heard van Dam and invited him to record Ravel’s L’heure espagnole with him for Deutsche Grammophon. In 1967, Maazel asked him to join the Deutsche Oper in Berlin.

Van Dam has performed at L’Opéra de Paris, Covent Garden, the Metropolitan Opera, Teatro alla Scala in Milan, Vienna State Opera, Deutsche Oper Berlin, the Théâtre Royal de la Monnaie in Brussels, Teatro Colón in Buenos Aires, the Salzburg Festival, and festivals in Aix-en-Provence and Orange, France. 

Van Dam has become the Master in Residence of the singing section at the Queen Elisabeth Music Chapel in his home country, Belgium, since 2011.

Awards
Van Dam is also a concert, oratorio, and Lieder singer and has won international awards for his performances on stage and in recordings. Berlin conferred on him the title of Kammersänger in 1974, and the same year he received the German Music Critics’ Prize. Other awards include the Gold Medal of the Belgian Press (1976), Grand Prix de l’Académie française du Disque (1979), Orphée d’Or de l’Académie Lyrique Française (1980), the European Critics’ Prize, (1985), Diapason d’Or and Prix de la Nouvelle Académie du Disque (1993), and the Orphée d’Or de l’Académie du Disque Lyrique (1994).

In August 1998, His Majesty King Albert II of Belgium made van Dam a baron, recognizing him as one of the finest classical singers. On 4 December 1999 van Dam was one of the performers at the marriage of Belgium's Crown Prince Philippe and Mathilde d'Udekem d'Acoz.

Van Dam is featured as one of the three interviewees in 'Doucement les Basses', with Gabriel Bacquier and Claudio Desderi discussing their approach to roles in the bass-baritone repertoire.

Films

Van Dam appears in the films The Music Teacher (1988) as Joachim Dallayrac, and in Don Giovanni (1979) as Leporello, directed by Joseph Losey, and conducted by Maazel.  Also featured in that film are Ruggero Raimondi, Dame Kiri Te Kanawa, Teresa Berganza, Edda Moser, Malcolm King, Kenneth Riegel and John Macurdy. Van Dam also appears as Hans Sachs in the DVD of the 2003 Zürich Opera production of Die Meistersinger conducted by Franz Welser-Möst.

Recordings 

Among van Dam's extensive discography are complete recordings of Carmen (thrice, in 1974, 1975 and 1982), Louise (with Beverly Sills, 1977), Die Zauberflöte (as the Speaker, opposite Zdzisława Donat's Queen of Night, 1980), Faust (conducted by Michel Plasson, 1991), Les contes d'Hoffmann (with Roberto Alagna, 1994–1996), Don Carlos (1996), and Die Meistersinger (conducted by Sir Georg Solti, 1997).  In 2010, the Metropolitan released his 1980 Wozzeck (with Anja Silja and Richard Cassilly, conducted by James Levine) on Compact Discs.

With Herbert von Karajan, he also recorded Fidelio (opposite Jon Vickers, 1970), Le nozze di Figaro (1978), Salome (1978), Pelléas et Mélisande (1978), Parsifal (with Peter Hofmann, 1979–1980), Die Zauberflöte (as Sarastro, with Edith Mathis, Karin Ott, and Janet Perry, 1980), and Der fliegende Holländer (to Dunja Vejzovic's Senta, 1981–1983), Ein Deutsches Requiem with Barbara Hendricks (1985), as well as Beethoven's Ninth Symphony (with Anna Tomowa-Sintow, Agnes Baltsa, Peter Schreier in 1977; Perry, Baltsa, and Vinson Cole in 1983).

One of the bass-baritone's greatest successes was as the title role in Olivier Messiaen's Saint François d'Assise.  The world-premiere was recorded under Seiji Ozawa (1983), as was the Salzburg production, under Kent Nagano (1998).

See also
 Berlioz: La damnation de Faust (Georg Solti recording)
 Debussy: Pelléas et Mélisande (Herbert von Karajan recording)
 Mozart: Le nozze di Figaro (Herbert von Karajan recording)
 Rameau: Dardanus (Raymond Leppard recording)

References

MALISCH, KURT. (2001) 2016. “Dam, José van.” In: MGG Online, edited by Laurenz Lütteken. Bärenreiter, Metzler, RILM, 2016–. Accessed August 27, 2022. https://www.mgg-online.com/mgg/stable/12468

Sources
Warrack, John & West, Ewan (1992), The Oxford Dictionary of Opera, 782 pages,

External links
Interview with José van Dam, April 24, 1981 (Mostly about Wagner)
 Colbert Artists Management Inc.

1940 births
Living people
Barons of Belgium
Belgian opera singers
Royal Conservatory of Brussels alumni
Academic staff of the Conservatoire de Paris
Chevaliers of the Légion d'honneur
Commandeurs of the Ordre des Arts et des Lettres
Officers of the Order of Leopold II
Grammy Award winners
Operatic bass-baritones
People from Ixelles
Belgian male actors